Srikakulam revenue division (or Srikakulam division) is a revenue division in the Srikakulam district of the Indian state of Andhra Pradesh. It is one of the three revenue divisions in the district with thirteen mandals under its administration. The divisional headquarters are located at Srikakulam.

Administration 
The 13 mandals administered under the revenue division are:

Demographics 
The division has a population of 10,05,427. Rural population was 7,79,693 and urban population was 2,25,734. Scheduled Castes and Scheduled Tribes make up 9.13% and 0.73% of the population respectively.

98.65% of the population are Hindus. 98.93% of the population spoke Telugu as their first language.

See also 
List of revenue divisions in Andhra Pradesh
List of mandals in Andhra Pradesh

References 

Revenue divisions in Andhra Pradesh
Srikakulam district